Jack Whitford (born 3 January 1924) is a British former gymnast who competed in the 1952 Summer Olympics. He was born in Swansea, was affiliated with Swansea Boys Club and is the half brother of gymnast Arthur Whitford, who represented Great Britain at the 1928 Summer Olympics.

References

1924 births
Living people
Sportspeople from Swansea
Welsh male artistic gymnasts
British male artistic gymnasts
Olympic gymnasts of Great Britain
Gymnasts at the 1952 Summer Olympics